"Don't Play Your Rock 'n' Roll to Me" is a song by British rock band Smokie. It was released in early September 1975 as a single and appeared later on the album Changing All the Time. Like the band's previous two singles "Pass It Around" and "If You Think You Know How to Love Me", the song was composed by Nicky Chinn/Mike Chapman.

The acoustic guitar riff in "Don't Play Your Rock 'n' Roll to Me" is adopted from the Elvis Presley hit "His Latest Flame".

The single was as successful as the previous one. It debuted in the UK Singles Chart on 4 October 1975, reaching #8 and lingering in the charts for 7 weeks.

Track listing

Charts

Johnny Hallyday version (in French) 

The song was adapted into French and in 1976 released (under the title "Joue pas de rock'n'roll pour moi") by French singer Johnny Hallyday.

Track listing 
7" single Philips 6042 16 (France, etc.)
 "Derrière l'amour" (4:40)
 "Joue pas de rock'n'roll pour moi" ("Don't Play Your Rock 'n' Roll to Me") (3:33)

Other cover versions 
Chris Norman included his solo cover of the song on his 2000 studio album "Full Circle".

References

External links
Smokie discography 1975-1982

Songs about rock music
Smokie (band) songs
1975 singles
Songs written by Nicky Chinn
Songs written by Mike Chapman
Song recordings produced by Mike Chapman
Country rock songs
1975 songs
RAK Records singles